Alice Bah Kuhnke (born Alice Bah; 21 December 1971) is a Swedish politician for the Green Party who is currently a Member of the European Parliament since 2019. Previously she served as the Minister of Culture and Democracy From October 2014 to January 2019. Before going into politics, she was a television presenter. She also helped found the think tank Sektor3.

She was elected Member of the European Parliament in the 2019 European Parliament election in Sweden.

Biography
Bah grew up in Horda in Jönköping, Sweden, the daughter of a Gambian father and a Swedish mother. She attended a track-and-field-oriented high school in Växjö and was one of the country's best female sprinters in the late 1980s, with the 200-meter dash her speciality.

Television career
Bah's television career began with SVT's "Disney Club" in 1992. Between 1998 and 1999, she had her own talk show at TV4 and many other television assignments, including the current-event show "Kalla fakta".

On 16 January 2001, She hosted the televised music festival Artister mot nazister in Globen.

Private and public sector career 
Alice Bah Kuhnke was Director General for the Swedish Agency for Youth and Civil Society 2013-2014. She also worked as General Secretary for the NGO Fairtraide Sweden (Rättvisemärkt) 2004-2007 In September 2009, Bah took the position of manager of environmental quality and corporate social responsibility at ÅF. Alongside that job, she served on the board of a small internet design firm, Doberman.

Political career
In 1994, Bah campaigned actively for her country to join the EU in a referendum. After leaving television to study political science, she headed a philanthropic fund at the Swedish insurance company Skandia.

Bah was a member of the Swedish Church synod from 2006 until 2010, a member of the board of the Royal Dramatic Theater, and Vice President of YMCA-YWCA Sweden.

On 3 October 2014, Bah was appointed Minister of Culture and Democracy in the Löfven Cabinet. In addition to her role in government, she served as the Green Party's representative at the European Green Party from 2016.

Member of the European Parliament, (2019–present)

In 2019, Bah stood down as minister to lead her party's list for the European elections. In parliament, she has since been serving as deputy chairwoman of the Greens–European Free Alliance (Greens/EFA) group, under the leadership of co-chairs Ska Keller and Philippe Lamberts. She also joined the Committee on Civil Liberties, Justice and Home Affairs and the Committee on Women's Rights and Gender Equality.

In addition to her committee assignments, Bah is a member of the European Parliament Intergroup on Anti-Corruption, the European Parliament Intergroup on Anti-Racism and Diversity, the European Parliament Intergroup on LGBT Rights and the European Parliament Intergroup on the Welfare and Conservation of Animals.

In January 2022, she was the Greens/EFA candidate as a new President of the European Parliament. She was not elected, having garnered only 101 votes in the first round.

Personal life
In her late teens, Bah was engaged for two years to long jump Olympic finalist and World Silver Medalist Mattias Sunneborn. In 1998, she married TV personality Henrik Johnsson, from whom she was divorced in 2002. The following year, she married actor and singer Johannes Kuhnke, with whom she has three daughters.

References

|-

|-

|-

|-

1971 births
Living people
Swedish television journalists
Swedish people of Gambian descent
Swedish Ministers for Culture
Green Party (Sweden) politicians
Women government ministers of Sweden
Women television journalists
Green Party (Sweden) MEPs
MEPs for Sweden 2019–2024
21st-century women MEPs for Sweden
21st-century Swedish women politicians
YMCA leaders
People from Värnamo Municipality